See Austin A40 for other (previous) Austin A40 models.

The Austin A40 Farina is a small, economy car introduced by Austin in saloon (1958) and A40 Countryman (1959) estate versions. It has a two-box body configuration. It was badged, like many before it, as an A40, consistent with Austin's naming scheme at the time, based on the approximate engine output in horsepower; and to distinguish it from other A40 models, it was also given a suffix name – this one being the Farina, reflecting the all-new design by Italian Battista Farina's Pinin Farina Turin studio.

Austin had been merged into the British Motor Corporation (BMC) in 1952 and – unusually for BMC at the time  – the A40 Farina was sold only as an Austin and not rebadged for sale under any other BMC brands. The Farina was the first Austin A40 not named after a county of England, and the last in the Austin A40 line.

The 1959 A40 Countryman version stands out by its layout as a small estate car with an upward (and downward) opening tailgate, and is therefore viewed as one of the earliest examples of a volume production hatchback.

Background
Like its predecessors, the A40 Countryman version was again combining many of the virtues of a compact saloon and estate car in one body — but unlike the 1954 A30 Countryman, (a sub ) estate car version of the 1951 Austin A30), and its 1956 A35 Countryman evolution – the all new A40 Countryman had a split lifting and lowering tailgate instead of the sideways opening rear doors, seen from the 1948 A40 Countryman through the A35.

This different feature made the A40 Farina derived Countryman an early example of what later became popular as a hatchback. Furthermore, Pinin Farina's body design offered more shoulder and headroom for the rear passengers, through the use of angular instead of curved lines of the roof and upper rear body, while as a two-seater (with the rear seat folded), it provided an exceptionally large luggage space.

The original saloon version luggage boot has a tail board that swings down, while the rear window remains fixed, and the space behind the rear seat is usually covered by a vinyl tonneau cover. This can be removed, and the rear seats folded to permit the whole of the back of the car to be used for luggage, though the loading floor achieved was far from flat.

The design was by Pinin Farina of Italy. At a time when Turin auto-design studios were, for the most part, consulted only by builders of expensive "exotic" cars, the manufacturers made much of the car's Italian styling, with both Battista Farina and his son Sergio being present at the car's UK launch. The car appeared as a scaled-down version of the Austin Cambridge and Morris Oxford, but without an extended boot. These cars were also designed by Pinin Farina.

Naming
The A40 designation had been used on a series of previous Austins, most recently the Cambridge, but the "Farina" suffix was new with this car, marketing the Pinin Farina design – contrary to all previous A40s, which had been named after counties of England. The Countryman name, on the other hand, had been used on several previous Austin (A40) estate models. Early examples including the somewhat larger 1948 Countryman estate of the 1947 A40 Devon / Dorset, and the more upscale 1948 A70 Countryman – but also on the estate versions of the A40 Farina's direct A30 and A35 predecessors.

The Farina name was not used in Sweden, where the car received the name "Futura" because a mix-up with a common type of brown sugar with a similar name was believed to be unavoidable.

Mark I

Presented as a saloon at the London Motor Show in October 1958, the A40 Farina was intended to replace the Austin A35, from which it inherited much of its running gear, and was a capacious thoroughly modern small car, with a brand new distinctive "two box" shape and headroom in the back seat. It was a saloon, the lower rear panel dropped like a then conventional bootlid, the rear window remaining fixed.

The Countryman hatchback appeared exactly a year later in October 1959, and differed from the saloon in that the rear window was marginally smaller, to allow for a frame that could be lifted up, with its own support, while the lower panel was now flush with the floor and its hinges had been strengthened. It was a very small estate car with a horizontally split tailgate having a top-hinged upper door and bottom-hinged lower door.  October 1959 also saw the standardisation on both cars of self-cancelling indicators and the provision of a centre interior light and, in early summer 1960, a flat lid was added over the spare wheel in the rear luggage compartment.

At launch the car shared the 948 cc A-Series straight-4 used in other Austins including its A35 predecessor. The suspension was independent at the front using coil springs with a live axle and semi elliptic leaf springs at the rear. The drum brakes were a hybrid (hydromech) arrangement, hydraulically operated at the front but cable actuated at the rear. Cam and peg steering was fitted.

Individual seats were fitted in the front, with a bench at the rear that could fold down to increase luggage capacity. The trim material was a vinyl treated fabric. Options included a heater, radio, windscreen washers and white-wall tyres. The gearchange lever was floor-mounted with the handbrake between the seats. The door windows were not opened by conventional winders, but pulled up and down using finger grips; a window lock position was on the door handle.

The test car cost £689 including taxes of £230.

Mark II

An A40 Farina Mark II was introduced in 1961.  It had a  longer wheelbase to increase the space for passengers in the back seats, and the front grille and dashboard were redesigned. The Mark II had more power (37 hp/28 kW) and an SU replaced the previous Zenith carburettor but was otherwise similar mechanically. An anti-roll bar was fitted at the front. The 948 cc engine was replaced in the autumn of 1962 by a larger 1098 cc version with an output of 48 bhp. The A40 shared this engine with the Morris Minor, which was also rear-wheel drive – both models retaining the traditional north–south engine layout – and also with the recently introduced front-wheel drive, transverse-engined Morris 1100. An improved gearbox was fitted to the A40 at the same time.

Further changes were minimal.   However, in 1964 a new fascia with imitation wood veneer covering was fitted. This version of the model remained in production until 1967. The brakes also became fully hydraulic, replacing the semi cable-operated rear system that the Mark I had inherited from the A35. Nevertheless, the introduction at the end of 1962 of the similarly sized Morris 1100, followed by an Austin-badged counterpart a year later, left the A40 looking cramped on the inside and outclassed in terms of road holding and ride; sales of the A40 Mark II progressed at a slower rate than had been achieved by the Mark I.

A Mark II was tested by The Motor in 1962. The car cost £693 including taxes of £218.

In the popular television series Heartbeat, the character Dr Tricia Summerbee (played by Clare Calbraith) drove a blue 1963 mark II saloon in series 10–12, with the registration BNK228A.

Engines
 1958–61: 948 cc A-Series I4, 34 hp (25 kW) at 4750 rpm and 50 ft·lbf (68 Nm) at 2000 rpm
 1961–62: 948 cc A-Series I4, 37 hp (28 kW) at 5000 rpm and 50 ft·lbf (68 Nm) at 2500 rpm
 1962–67: 1098 cc A-Series I4, 48 hp (36 kW) at 5100 rpm and 60 ft·lbf (81 Nm) at 2500 rpm

Innocenti

Innocenti also produced A40s under licence from BMC.  They began producing knock-down kit versions of the A40 in 1960 but soon progressed to produce the entire car in Italy.  Innocenti's A40 Berlina and Combinata corresponded to the saloon and Countryman versions of the Austin A40 Farina.

The cars began using the larger 1098 cc engine in 1962, being renamed A40S at that time.  For 1965 Innocenti also designed a new single-piece rear door for the Combinata.  This top-hinged door used struts to hold it up over a wide cargo opening and was a true hatchback – a model never developed in the home (United Kingdom) market. 67,706 Innocenti A40 and A40S cars were produced.

Australian production
The A40 Farina was also produced in Sydney, New South Wales, Australia by the British Motor Corporation (Australia) Pty Ltd from 1959 to 1962. These Australian assembled vehicles had a very high degree of local content.

Competition history
The car was a popular choice, in modified form, for competition work. Several examples are still to be seen taking part in historic saloon racing.

In the January 1959 Monte Carlo Rally driven by Pat Moss and Ann Wisdom the A40 won the Coupe des Dames, Houbigant Cup, RAC Challenge Trophy and Souvenir Award, "L'Officiel de la Couture" and was 2nd in class for standard series production touring cars up to 1000 cc. The little car was 10th in General Classification.

In the closing stages of June's Alpine Rally (Coupe des Alpes), Moss and Wisdom lost the use of first gear on their A40 and were obliged to retire having completed the second stage of the rally still "clean".

In August 1959, in practice at Brands Hatch, Doc Shepherd broke the saloon car record in an Austin A40 and he won the 1960 British Saloon Car Championship, also driving an Austin A40 Farina.

Notes

References

External links

Austin Memories—History of Austin and Longbridge
A40 Farina Buyers Guide Advice on buying the A40 Farina, at oldclassiccar.
The unofficial Austin-Rover site section on the Farina A40
The unofficial Austin-Rover site buyers' guide on the Farina A40
The A40 Farina Club based in the UK

A40 Farina
Hatchbacks
Rear-wheel-drive vehicles
Pininfarina
1960s cars
Cars introduced in 1958
Cars discontinued in 1967
Sedans